Walter Bishop Mant (6 February 1808 – 6 April 1869) was an Anglican priest in Ireland during the 19th century.

The son of Bishop Richard Mant, he was born in Buriton and educated at Oriel College, Oxford. He was Archdeacon of Connor from 1832 to 1834; and Archdeacon of Down from 1828 until his death.

Notes

Alumni of Oriel College, Oxford
Church of Ireland priests
19th-century Irish Anglican priests
1869 deaths
1808 births
Archdeacons of Down
Archdeacons of Connor
People from Buriton